The 2021–22 Kosovo Basketball SuperLeague was the 28rd season of the Kosovo Basketball Superleague. The season started on September 14, 2021, and ended on June 2, 2022. KB Ylli won its second title.

Teams

KB Vëllaznimi has been promoted to the league after winning 2021–22 Kosovo Basketball First League. KB Kastrioti who finished in last place during the 2015–2016 season, relegated from the Super League

Venues and locations

Notes

 Promoted from the 2015–16 Kosovo Basketball First League.
 Teams that play in the 2016–17 FIBA Europe Cup

Regular season

Playoffs
The quarter-finals and finals were played in a best-of-three playoff format.
The semi-finals and finals were played in a best-of-five playoff format. The higher seeded teams played game one, three and five (if necessary) at home.

Play-out
Kerasan Prishtina defeated Drita in the relegation playoffs.

References

External links
Official website of Kosovo Basketball Superleague

Kosovo Basketball Superleague seasons
Kosovo
Basketball